Columbitrechus subsulcatus is a species of beetle in the family Carabidae, the only species in the genus Columbitrechus.

References

Trechinae